The Tangbu Cultural Park is a cultural center in Wanhua District, Taipei, Taiwan, transformed from a former sugar refinery.

History
The cultural center was originally constructed as Taipei Sugar Refinery during the Japanese rule of Taiwan and run from 1911 to 1942. After the handover of Taiwan from Japan to the Republic of China in 1945, the factory was taken over by Taiwan Sugar Corporation. The building was declared the 106th historical site of Taipei in 2003.

Architecture
The cultural center spans over an area of one hectare. It consists of three warehouses, which house permanent exhibition, Tangbu Cultural Warehouse and troupe residence.

Transportation
The cultural center is accessible within walking distance southwest of Longshan Temple Station of Taipei Metro.

See also
 List of tourist attractions in Taiwan

References

Cultural centers in Taipei
Sugar refineries in Taiwan